Senator Coffman may refer to:

Charles G. Coffman (1875–1929), West Virginia State Senate
Mike Coffman (born 1955), Colorado State Senate